Hapoel Tel Aviv Football Club (Moadon Kaduregel Hapoel Tel Aviv) is an Israeli football club based in Tel Aviv that competes in the Israeli Premier League. The club's traditional home ground is Bloomfield Stadium. To date, the club has won 13 championships and 16 State Cups. In 1967, Hapoel Tel Aviv became the first club to win the Asian Champion Club Tournament.

Since 1995, the club has competed in European club competitions, and has the highest rank among all Israeli clubs, with some outstanding achievements, such as wins against Chelsea, Milan, Hamburg, Paris Saint-Germain, Benfica, Rangers, and Celtic. It is also one of only three Israeli teams to have qualified for the UEFA Champions League group stage, and one of the two that are ordinary members of the European Club Association.

The club name, "Hapoel", translates to "The Worker", and combined with its red Hammer and sickle badge represents the club ties to Marxism, socialism, Labor Zionism, and the working class. For seven decades, the club was owned by the Histadrut, Israel's national trade union center.

History

Pre-independence
Hapoel Tel Aviv F.C. was originally established in 1923, but was disbanded soon after. The club was re-formed in 1925, and then for a third time in May 1926. In 1927 the club merged with Allenby F.C., giving the club its modern form. It is part of the Hapoel sports association which was affiliated with the Histadrut, and supporters of the club were often referred to as communists.

In 1928 the club reached the Palestine Cup final (the first one to be recognised by the Israel Football Association). Although they beat Maccabi Hasmonean Jerusalem 2–0, Hapoel fielded an ineligible player, resulting in the cup being shared.

The 1933–34 saw the club win the double, finishing as champions of the Palestine League, winning every match, the only Israeli club to have achieved such a feat, and winners of the cup, beating local rivals Maccabi Tel Aviv 3–2 in the final. The 1934–35 season saw Hapoel led the league table, but the championship was abandoned and they were not declared champions. The 1937–38 season ended the same way, with Hapoel top of the league, but the season abandoned. In the meantime, the club won the cup again in 1937, 1938, and 1939, and remain the only club to have won the trophy in three successive seasons (although the Royal Air Force won it four years in a row between 1924 and 1927, pre-1928 wins are not recognised by the IFA).

In 1939–40, they won their second championship. The following season no national championships were held, but the club won the tournament for Hapoel-affiliated clubs. They won a third championship in the 1943–44 season, and in the following year won the northern region league, as well as what became known as the "War Cup", which was boycotted by
Beitar-affiliated clubs. In the cup final Hapoel were leading Hapoel Petah Tikva 1–0, but the match was abandoned on 89 minutes when a Petah Tikva player refused to leave the pitch after being sent off for insulting the referee.

Post-independence

Following Israeli independence, Hapoel joined the new Israeli League. They won the title in 1956–57 and the State Cup in 1961, beating Hapoel Petah Tikva 2–1.

In the 1965–66 season Hapoel won the title, and qualified for the first Asian Club Championships. In the tournament Hapoel were given byes all the way to the final, where they beat Selangor 2–1 to become Asia's first club champions. The club also reached the State Cup final that year, but lost 2–1 to Maccabi Tel Aviv.

Hapoel won the title again in 1968–69, and again qualified for the Asian Club championships. Although they reached the final, they lost 2–1 to Iranian side Taj Tehran (in an era when Iran and Israel had diplomatic relations). They won the State Cup again in 1972, beating Hapoel Jerusalem 1–0 in the final, but did not win the title again until 1980–81, when they missed out on the double after losing the cup final 4–3 on penalties (after a 2–2 draw) to Bnei Yehuda. The following season they reached the cup final again, but lost 1–0 to Hapoel Yehud. A hat-trick of cup final defeats was avoided when they beat Maccabi Tel Aviv 3–2 in the 1982 final.

Another title was won in 1985–86, and another in 1987–88. However, the following season Hapoel finished bottom of the league (with a four-point deduction for breaking budget rules) and were relegated to the second tier for the first time in their history.

The club made an immediate return to the top division as Liga Artzit runners-up, though they only beat Maccabi Yavne to the second promotion slot on goal difference. In 1997–98 Hapoel finished second, and qualified for Europe for the second time. In the 1998–99 UEFA Cup Hapoel knocked out FinnPa, before losing on penalties to Strømsgodset. In the same season they won the State Cup, beating Beitar Jerusalem 3–1 on penalties after a 1–1 draw.

21st century

The 1999–2000 season saw Hapoel win the double, claiming their first title in over a decade and winning the State Cup (beating Beitar Jerusalem on penalties again). However, they failed to reach the group stages of the Champions League after being beaten 5–1 on aggregate by Sturm Graz. They finished second in the league in 2000–01 and 2001–02 and third in 2002–03, qualifying for the UEFA Cup on each occasion. In the 2001–02 UEFA Cup Hapoel reached the quarter-finals after knocking out Chelsea, Lokomotiv Moscow and Parma. Although they beat A.C. Milan 1–0 in the home leg (a match which had to be played in the GSP Stadium in Cyprus as UEFA did not allow matches to be held in Israel due to security reasons), Hapoel lost the away leg 2–0.

In 2002 the club won its first Toto Cup. They won the State Cup in 2006, beating Bnei Yehuda 1–0 in the final, and also won it the following season, when they defeated second division Hapoel Ashkelon on penalties. They reached the final again in 2007–08, but lost 5–4 on penalties to Beitar Jerusalem after a 0–0 draw.

In 2009–10, the club won the double, claiming the State Cup after a 3–1 victory over Bnei Yehuda. The title was won after a dramatic game against Beitar Jerusalem on the final day of the season, with Eran Zahavi scoring the title-winning goal two minutes into injury time. The club also had a successful season in the Europa League, winning their group, before losing to Rubin Kazan in the second round. The following season they reached the group stages of the Champions League for the first time, but failed to advance to the next round. at the same season the team reached to the second place and won the Israeli State Cup for the second time in row.

In the beginning of season 2011–12 most of the successful players of the team left and spread at Europe, also the Team's manager Eli Guttman left too. The club's legendary coach, Dror Kashtan, returned and new players came as part of the transfer of ownership of the club to Eli Tabib. During the season there was tension between the manager Dror Kashtan and Eli Tabib, which led to the manager's departure and current Manager was appointed in his place, Nitzan Shirazi, who led the team winning the Israeli State Cup for the third time in a row. After large-scale protests of the fans against the club's owner Tabib and his unprofessional conduct, he decided to leave the club after one year and sold it to Haim Ramon and to the supporters' trust called "Haadumim", "The Reds" in Hebrew, that establish at the summer of 2012 and raise 2 million shekel for 20% of the ownership. The other part of the club sold to several other businessmen. Altogether the club sold at summer 2012 for 12 million NIS (about $ 3 Million).
At the beginning of season 2012–13, Yossi Abuksis was appointed coach in place of Nitzan Shirazi, who appointed professional manager due to his health reasons. On 1 July 2015, the club was bought by Amir Gross Kabiri.

Stadium

Bloomfield Stadium

After playing at three different stadiums, the club moved to the Basa Stadium in 1950, after the 1948 Arab-Israeli War. In 1962 the ground was renovated using donation from the Bloomfield family, thus receiving its official name. The ground was owned by Tel Aviv histadrut branch, who were also owners of Hapoel, although today it is a municipal stadium.

The stadium, located in Jaffa, is an upgraded version of the older stadium called "Basa". The first match at Bloomfield was played on 12 December 1962 against FC Twente, the game ending in a 1–1 draw. The stadium is currently shared with city rivals Maccabi (who moved to the ground in 1963) and Bnei Yehuda (since 2004).

Hapoel main fans' gate is gate 5, where Ultras Hapoel lead the cheering, and away crowds sit oppositely, on Gate 11. Another traditional Hapoel fans' gate is gate 7.

Supporters and politics

The club is the standard-bearer of the Israeli left and far-left. It was the last club to cut formal links with politics, in this case the trade union movement and the moderate Social Democratic Labor Party Mapai, as well more radical parties such as the Marxist Party Mapam, its predecessor Hashomer Hatzair Workers Party, and the Marxist-Leninist Israeli Communist Party (Maki).

Ultras Hapoel often wave flags emblazoned with the faces of Che Guevara and Karl Marx, as well as banners with the slogan "Workers of the world, unite!". The club ultras has friendships with many other antifa supporter groups, including strong bonds with fans of FC St. Pauli, Standard Liège, Omonia Nicosia, and Celtic F.C.

A Haaretz poll published in June 2011 identified Hapoel Tel Aviv as the second most popular football team among Israeli Arabs, behind Maccabi Haifa.

Another survey had been conducted in March 2012 by Yedioth showed that Hapoel is the fourth most popular team among Israeli football fans (nineteen percent). The same survey revealed that thirty-two percent of Tel Aviv residents support the team.

Rivalries

Rivalry with Maccabi Tel Aviv

Hapoel's main rivals are Maccabi Tel Aviv, whose game against them is the Tel Aviv derby.

Rivalry with Beitar Jerusalem
Another rivalry with Beitar Jerusalem which is a political rivalry, which is considered (and considers itself) the team of the Israeli far-right.

Players

Current squad
As of 15 March 2023

Players out on loan

Foreigners 2022–23
Only up to six non-Israeli nationals can be in an Israeli club, but only five can play at the same time on the pitch. Those with Jewish ancestry, married to an Israeli, or have played in Israel for an extended period of time, can claim a passport or permanent residency which would allow them to play with Israeli status.

 Godfried Roemeratoe
 Alen Ožbolt
 Pablo González

Coaching staff

Honours

Domestic

League

Cups

International

Other

Youth Division

Record in Europe

European competitions
UEFA Champions League
Group stage: 2010–11
UEFA Cup/UEFA Europa League
Quarter-finals: 2001–02
Round of 32: 2006–07, 2009–10
Group stage: 2007–08, 2011–12, 2012–13

UEFA club rankings

Coaches

 Monia Goldstein (1947–??)
 Musta Poliakov (1949–??)
 Zvi Erlich (1950–??)
 Ivan Jazbinšek (1956–57)
 Edmond Schmilovich (1958–60)
 Jenő Kalmár (1960–62)
 Harry Game (1963–64)
 David Schweitzer (1965–66)
 Yosef Merimovich (1966–68)
 Rehavia Rosenbaum (1968–70)
 Harry Game (1971–74)
 Shimon Ben Yehonathan (1974–75)
 Rehavia Rosenbaum (1975–76)
 Yosef Merimovich (1977–79)
 David Schweitzer (1980–82)
 Zvi Rosen (1982–83)
 Mordechai Spiegler (1984)
 David Schweitzer (1986–87)
 David Schweitzer (1989–90)
 Shimon Shenhar (1990)
 Moshe Sinai (1991–96)
 Ya'akov Grundman (1992)
 Yehoshua Feigenbaum (1993–94)
 Dror Kashtan (1 July 1996 – 30 June 1997)
 Eli Cohen (1 July 1997 – 30 June 1999)
 Dror Kashtan (1 July 1999 – 30 June 2004)
 Gili Landau (June 2004 – 4 Dec)
 Shmuel Hanin (15 Nov 2004 – 31 Dec 2004)
 Yehoshua Feigenbaum (Dec 2004 – 5 June 2005)
 Dror Kashtan (1 July 2005 – 31 Dec 2005)
 Itzhak Shum (1 July 2006 – 31 Dec 2006)
 Nir Levine (Dec 2006 – 7 June 2007)
 Guy Luzon (1 July 2007 – 15 Jan 2008)
 Eli Guttman (Dec 2007 – 25 May 2011)
 Dror Kashtan (4 June 2011 – 9 Jan 2012)
 Nitzan Shirazi (11 Jan 2012 – Sept 27, 2012)
 Yossi Abukasis (Sept 27, 2012 – 17 Feb 2013)
 Freddy David (18 Feb 2013 – 18 May 2013)
 Ran Ben Shimon (20 May 2013 – 26 May 2014)
 Asi Domb (26 May 2014 – 24 January 2015)
 Eli Cohen (24 January 2015 – 5 November 2015)
 Guy Levy (5 November 2015 – January 2016)
 Eli Guttman (January 2016 – September 2016)
 Guy Luzon (September 2016 – 11 January 2017)
 Meni Koretski (11 January 2017 – 16 May 2017)
 Moti Ivanir (26 May 2017 – 26 October 2017)
 Kobi Refua (30 October 2017 - 26 November 2018)
 Ofir Haim (27 November 2018 - 6 January 2019)
 Kobi Refua (7 January 2019 - 16 May 2019)
 Nisso Avitan (16 May 2019 - 5 November 2019)
 Nir Klinger (5 November 2019 - 19 December 2021)
 Kobi Refua (19 December 2021 - Now)

Notable former players

Captains

Most appearances

Most League Goals

References

External links

Official club website (in Hebrew)
Ultras Hapoel Official website
Shedim – Hapoel Tel Aviv Forum (in Hebrew)
Fans Wikipedia (in Hebrew)

 
Hapoel Tel Aviv
Tel Aviv
Association football clubs established in 1923
Tel Aviv
Football clubs in Tel Aviv
1923 establishments in Mandatory Palestine
AFC Champions League winning clubs